Isacsson or Isacson is a surname. Notable people with the surname include:

 Arne Isacsson (1917–2010), Swedish artist
 Håkan Isacson (1943–2002), Swedish spy
 Lars Isacsson (born 1970), Swedish politician
 Leo Isacson (1910–1996), American politician
 Linda Isacsson (born 1972), Swedish beauty pageant winner and television personality
 Magnus Isacsson (1948–2012), Canadian film director